Mirești is a commune in Hînceşti District, Moldova. It is composed of two villages, Chetroșeni and Mirești.

References

Communes of Hîncești District